Baháʼí Studies Review was a peer-reviewed academic journal, published annually from 1991 to 2015, that covered contemporary issues regarding the principles, history, and philosophy of the Baháʼí Faith. Note that some formats, including the ISO 4 record, use "Bahaʼi" or "Bahá'í" rather than the "Baháʼí" shown at the official website.

History
The journal was published by Intellect Books, on behalf of the Association for Baháʼí Studies (English-Speaking Europe) from 1991 to February 2006, then the Association for Baháʼí Studies (United Kingdom) thereafter.

Both versions of the "Association" were agencies of the National Spiritual Assembly of the United Kingdom.

Association for Baháʼí Studies (English-Speaking Europe) issued Volume 1 (1991) through to Volume 13 (2005), with volumes 9 and 10 delayed enough that they were released as double issues (1999/2000 and 2001/2002, respectively).

Abstracting and indexing 
The journal is abstracted and indexed in:
 ATLA Religion Database
 Humanities International Complete
 Humanities International Index
 ProQuest Central
 TOC Premier

See also
 Baháʼí studies

References

External links 
 

Religious studies journals
Publications established in 1991
Annual journals
English-language journals